

Career
Paul Gachet (born 23 April 1955 in London, England) is a former motorcycle speedway rider.

He started his career with Eastbourne Eagles under Robert Dugard, who was also co-promoter at Oxford Rebels where Paul rode in the British League in 1975. In 1976, after threat of closure at Oxford, the team relocated to White City where Paul rode for 3 seasons before a move for his last year of racing to Mildenhall Fen Tigers.

References

External links
 http://www.speedwayplus.com/WhiteCity.shtml
 http://www.defunctspeedway.co.uk/London%20White%20City.htm

British motorcycle racers
Eastbourne Eagles riders
Newport Wasps riders
White City Rebels riders
Oxford Rebels riders
Swindon Robins riders
Halifax Dukes riders
Wolverhampton Wolves riders
Hull Vikings riders
Mildenhall Fen Tigers riders
British speedway riders
Living people
1955 births